Karukudi Sargunalingeswarar Temple
(கருக்குடி சற்குணலிங்கேஸ்வரர் கோயில்
)is a Hindu temple located at Karukudi in Thanjavur district, Tamil Nadu, India. The historical name of the place is Marudhanallur. The presiding deity is Shiva. He is called as Sargunalingeswarar. His consort is known as Advaita Nayaki.

Significance 
It is one of the shrines of the 275 Paadal Petra Sthalams - Shiva Sthalams glorified in the early medieval Tevaram poems by Tamil Saivite Nayanar Tirugnanasambandar.

Literary Mention 
Tirugnanasambandar describes the feature of the deity as:

References

External links 
 
 

Shiva temples in Thanjavur district
Padal Petra Stalam